Edith Helen Vane-Tempest-Stewart, Marchioness of Londonderry, DBE (née Chaplin; 3 December 1878 – 23 April 1959) was a noted and influential society hostess in the United Kingdom between World War I and World War II, a friend of the first Labour prime minister, Ramsay MacDonald. She was a noted gardener and a writer and editor of the works of others.

Early life
Born as Edith Helen Chaplin in Blankney, Lincolnshire, she was the daughter of Henry Chaplin, landowner and Conservative politician and later the 1st Viscount Chaplin (1840–1923), and Lady Florence Sutherland-Leveson-Gower (1855–1881). After the death of her mother in 1881, Edith was raised largely at Dunrobin Castle, Sutherland, the estate of her maternal grandfather, the third Duke of Sutherland.

Public works

In 1903 she was one of the founding members and member of the first committee of the Ladies Automobile Club. 

In 1914, after the outbreak of World War I, she was appointed the Colonel-in-Chief of the Women's Volunteer Reserve (WVR), a volunteer force formed of women replacing the men who had left work and gone up to the Front. The WVR was established in December 1914 in response to German bombing raids on East Coast towns during the First World War

Lady Londonderry also aided with the organisation of the Officers' Hospital set up in her house, and was the first woman to be appointed to be a Dame Commander of the Order of the British Empire in the Military Division, upon the Order's establishment in 1917.

Lady Londonderry's friendship with Prime Minister Ramsay MacDonald, although platonic, was a source of gossip in her time and has since become an iconic friendship of English social history.

In 1935 she helped to establish the Women's Gas Council, as its first president, assisted by organising secretary Katherine Halpin.

Gardens
When her father-in-law died in 1915, her husband inherited the title, whereupon Edith became Marchioness of Londonderry. This made her chatelaine of several large houses designed for entertaining, notably Londonderry House, the family's London townhouse in Mayfair, and Mount Stewart, the family seat in County Down. They also owned other properties such as Seaham Hall and Wynward Park in County Durham, and Plas Machynlleth in Wales.

During the 1920s, Lady Londonderry created the gardens at the Londonderry family estate of Mount Stewart, near Newtownards, County Down. She added the Shamrock Garden, the Sunken Garden, increased the size of the lake, added a Spanish Garden with a small hut, the Italian Garden, the Dodo Terrace, Menagerie, the Fountain Pool and laid out walks in the Lily Wood and rest of the estate. This dramatic change led to the gardens being proposed as a UNESCO World Heritage Site. She was a patron of the botanist and plant collector Frank Kingdon-Ward.

After she created her garden and the death of her husband, she gave the gardens to the National Trust in 1957. They are regarded by Heritage Island as being one of the best gardens in Britain and Ireland.

Personal life
On 28 November 1899, she married Charles Vane-Tempest-Stewart, Viscount Castlereagh. They were both 21. She married into a prominent land-owning and political family. Her husband was a soldier in World War I and is best remembered for his tenure as Secretary of State for Air in the 1930s, preserving the Royal Air Force against cuts, and for his praise of Nazi Germany in the 1930s. He was forced out of the government in 1935 and never returned. Together, they were the parents of five children:

 Lady Maureen Helen Vane-Tempest-Stewart (1900–1942), who married Oliver Stanley.
 Edward Charles Stewart Robert Vane-Tempest-Stewart (1902–1955), who was known as Robin and who became the 8th Marquess of Londonderry. He married Romaine Combe in 1931.
 Lady Margaret Frances Anne Vane-Tempest-Stewart (1910–1966), who married firstly Alan Muntz, and secondly Hugh Falkus.
 Lady Helen Maglona Vane-Tempest-Stewart (1911–1986), who married firstly Edward Jessel, 2nd Baron Jessel; secondly, Dennis Whittington Walsh; and, thirdly, Nigel Sundius-Hill.
Lady Mairi Elizabeth Vane-Tempest-Stewart (1921–2009), who married Viscount Bury.

On the death of the 7th Marquess, in 1949, Lady Londonderry became Dowager Marchioness of Londonderry. Lady Londonderry died of cancer on 23 April 1959, aged 80.

Descendants and legacy
One of Lady Londonderry's grandchildren, Annabel Goldsmith, is also a noted London socialite.

A number of gifts received by Lady Londonderry from Queen Mary, Sir Philip Sassoon and others were auctioned at Sotheby's in 2012.

Published works
Lady Londonderry wrote and/or edited several books, among which are:

 Henry Chaplin: A Memoir (1926).
The Magic Ink-Pot (1928).
The Russian journals of Martha and Catherine Wilmot : being an account by two Irish ladies of their adventures in Russia as guests of the celebrated Princess Daschkaw, containing vivid descriptions of contemporary court life and society, and lively anecdotes of many interesting historical characters, 1803-1808 (1934).
Retrospect (1938).
Frances Anne: The Life and Times of Frances Anne, Marchioness of Londonderry, and Her Husband, Charles, Third Marquess of Londonderry (1958).

Ancestry

References
Notes

Sources

External links

National Trust shines light on women's histories to celebrate the anniversary of female suffrage in 2018

1878 births
1959 deaths
Irish marchionesses
British socialites
British editors
British women editors
British biographers
Deaths from cancer in Northern Ireland
Dames Commander of the Order of the British Empire
Daughters of viscounts
People from Newtownards
People from North Kesteven District
People from Sutherland
Edith